Algimantas Masiulis (July 10, 1931 Surdegis, Anykščiai District Municipality —  August 19, 2008, Kaunas, Lithuania) was a Lithuanian film and theatre actor.

Biography 
Masiulis appeared in his first play in the autumn of 1948, in Schoolgirl, where he played the role of a gym student. The play was directed by his teacher, Juozas Miltinis. Over the course of his career, Masiulis portrayed over 90 characters. Masiulis appeared in Lithuanian, Russian and Soviet productions.

He performed at the Panevezys Drama Theatre for many years before joining the Kaunas State Drama Theatre in 1978. Masiulis also devoted more time to his drawings and art during the latter part of his life.

Masiulis was awarded the 3rd Class Order of the Lithuanian Grand Duke Gediminas in 1998 for his work in cinema and theater.

Death 
Algimantas Masiulis died on August 19, 2008, at the age of 77 in the city of Kaunas, Lithuania.

Selected filmography

Film
 Adam Wants to Be a Man (1959)
 Nobody Wanted to Die (1966)
 The Shield and the Sword (1968)
 Treasure Island (1971)
 Herkus Mantas (1972)
 Diamonds for the Dictatorship of the Proletariat (1975)
 The Autumn of My Childhood (1977)
 Destiny (1977)
 Armed and Dangerous (1977)
 American Tragedy (1981)
 Faktas (1981)
 Express on Fire (1981)
 Flight Over Atlantic Ocean (1982)
 Kai aš buvau partizanas (2008)

Television
 Entrance to the Labyrinth (1989)
 Criminal Stories (1995–1996)
  Kamenskaya (1999)

References

External links 
 
 

1931 births
2008 deaths
Soviet male actors
Lithuanian male stage actors
Lithuanian male film actors
Actors from Kaunas
Commander's Crosses of the Order of the Lithuanian Grand Duke Gediminas
20th-century Lithuanian male actors
Deaths from colorectal cancer
Burials at Petrašiūnai Cemetery